The Maldivian Democratic Party (Dhivehi Rayyithunge Demokretik Paati; MDP) is the first political party formed in the Republic of Maldives with a total membership of 53,139 individuals as of 11 July 2021. It is a party with its stated goal being the promotion of human rights and democracy in the Maldives. The party won the first ever multi-party elections in the Maldives with the support from all the other political parties in the 2008 elections against the president Maumoon Abdul Gayoom.

History

There had not been political parties in the Maldives since 1952. The MDP initially submitted its registration on 24 February 2001. In 2001, the party's first president was Qasim Ibrahim. Although the Maldivian Constitution allows political parties to operate, the MDP's application was rebuffed. After the people fighting for their rights on the street and the death of Evan Naseem, MDP declared its existence in exile from Sri Lanka on 10 November 2003. Initially, it was formed by a group of 42 people, which included members of parliament, a former cabinet minister and leading businessmen. Members on its first general council were elected on 13 February 2004. Although the MDP was not recognized by the Maldivian government, it began operating in Maldives on 30 April 2005.

On 2 June 2005, the members of the People's Majlis unanimously voted to legally recognize political parties. The MDP subsequently submitted its registration on 26 June 2005, becoming the first political party to be registered in the Second Republic of Maldives.

Throughout 2006, the opposition faced restrictions on freedom of assembly, and the government continued to arrest opposition activists. In March 2006, the government introduced a "Roadmap for Reform" and subsequently introduced several bills in parliament. In August 2007, voters decided via referendum that the Maldives' new constitution should provide for a presidential system of government (vice parliamentary). The special Majlis completed its work and the new constitution took effect in August 2008.

In accordance with the new constitution ratified by then-President Gayoom on 7 August 2008, the first round of presidential elections was held on 10 October 2008. Due to no single candidate receiving 50% of the vote, a second round was held on 29 October between President Gayoom and Mohamed Nasheed. Nasheed won with 54% of the vote.

At the first multi-party parliamentary elections in Maldives, on 9 May 2009, the MDP won 26 out of the 77 seats in the parliament, netting the second-most seats. However, the MDP gained the most votes, with a total of 35.3% (50,562 votes) which is a 10.39% increase from the first round of 2008 presidential elections when the MDP was allied with other parties. From the elections, Gayoom's DRP gained 27.5% of the votes (39,399 votes) which is a 12.5% decrease from the first round of the 2008 presidential elections. In November 2013 elections ex-President Mohamed  Nasheed, of the Maldivian Democratic Party (MDP) narrowly lost and Abdulla Yameen of PPM was elected as new president of Maldives.

In the 2018 presidential elections, the MDP candidate Ibrahim Mohamed Solih defeated incumbent President Abdulla Yameen, and was sworn in as president on November 17th, 2018. He promised to fight against widespread corruption and investigate the human rights abuses of the previous regime. In April 2019 parliamentary election The Maldivian Democratic Party (MDP) of President Ibrahim Mohamed Solih won a landslide victory, and won 65 of 87 seats of the parliament.  This was the first time a single party was able to get such a high number of seats in the parliament in Maldivian history.

Electoral history

President elections

People's Majlis elections

Notes

References

External links
 Official website of MDP
 Mohamed Nasheed's Presidential campaign site
 political information collected by US government about Maldives

Political parties in the Maldives
International Democrat Union member parties